Rashaad Newsome (born 1979)  is an American artist working at the intersection of assemblage, technology, sculpture, video, music, and performance. Newsome's work celebrates and abstracts Black and Queer contributions to the art canon, resulting in innovative and inclusive forms of culture and media. He lives and works in Oakland, California, and Brooklyn, New York.

Education 
Rashaad holds a B.F.A. in art history at Tulane University (2001) and a certificate of study in digital post production from Film/Video Arts Inc, New York (2004). In 2005 he studied MAX/MSP programming at Harvestworks Digital Media Art Center, New York.

Career 
His work has been exhibited, screened, and performed in galleries, museums, institutions, and festivals throughout the world, including the Park Avenue Armory, New York, The Studio Museum in Harlem, New York; the National Museum of African American History and Culture, Washington, D.C.; The Whitney Museum of American Art,, New York; Brooklyn Museum, New York; MoMA PS1, New York; SFMOMA, San Francisco; New Orleans Museum of Art, New Orleans; Centre Georges Pompidou, Paris; the Garage Center for Contemporary Culture, Moscow; and MUSA, Vienna. Newsome's work is in numerous public and private collections, including the Studio Museum, New York; The Whitney Museum of American Art, New York; The Brooklyn Museum of Art, New York; The San Francisco Museum of Modern Art, San Francisco; Los Angeles County Museum of Art, Los Angeles; McNay Art Museum, Texas; Virginia Museum of Fine Arts, Virginia, The Chazen Museum of Art, Wisconsin; National Museum of African American History and Culture, Washington, D.C.; and The New Britain Museum of American Art, Connecticut. In 2010 he participated in the Whitney Biennial, New York, and in 2011 Greater New York at MoMA PS1, New York.

As American writer and activist Darnell L. Moore notes, "Newsome's object-based work exists between assemblage, collage, and sculpture. His works explode categories of being and raise questions about what images and objects one can use to suture a representation. His pulling together of found images used to construct a body of work is analogous to the process one must go through to build a self. What parts do we rid? And which do we seek to create? Newsome's oeuvre is more than the work of a visual artist; it is an ontological project." In 2013 Rashaad launched his annual King of Arms Art Ball, a live performance event that brings together renowned figures from the art, fashion, music, literary, activism, and LGBTQAI+ Ballroom community. Since the creation of the King of Arms Art Ball, Rashaad has been using the architecture of ballroom as a way to get people to think critically about the ways in which the culture of domination is at play in their lives. Rashaad hopes to remove from ballroom what he calls a focus on the gender binary and allegiance to capitalism. Instead, he asks participants to focus on their creativity. For Rashaad, a big part of the King of Arms Art Ball, is thinking about the ways that we have not only colonized our minds but our imaginations. How do we decolonize our imaginations? How do we use them in the service of our own wellbeing or as a form of resistance? The King of Arms Art Ball continues the tradition of these historic Harlem-originating competitions but focuses all of its categories on the work and legacy of BIPOC LQBTQAI+ artists. The King of Arms Art Ball creates a platform to celebrate queer artists of color, engage in critical pedagogy, explore contemporary social justice issues, and provide space for emerging artists to showcase their work. Past categories were inspired by such visionaries as El Anatsui, the Nicholas Brothers, Lorna Simpson, and Bill T. Jones

In addition to his very active art practice, Newsome runs his own production company, Rashaad Newsome Studio. Rashaad Newsome Studio is a full-service production company specializing in the convergence of film, art, media, design, live performance, music, fashion, and technology, working with some of the industry's most visionary talent and brands, including Atlantic Records, Solange Knowles, ASAP Mob, Absolut, Lamborghini, Alexander Wang, Yohji Yamamoto, Jonathan Adler, Ballet National de Marseille, and Snapchat.

In 2019, with his LACMA Art + Technology Lab's Grant, Newsome created the first generation of his unique and provocative Artificial Intelligence, Being 1.0, which functioned as a critical tour guide to his 2020 exhibition To Be Real at Fort Mason Center for Art and Culture, in San Francisco, CA. During Being's interactions with viewers they explore a variety of challenging topics:

 Art historical erasure.
 The social implications of artificial intelligence regarding rights liberties.
 Labor and automation.
 The importance of the imagination as a form of liberation.
 The subjectivity of body autonomy within an inherently inequitable society.

At various points in Being's tour, they say, "Girl, bye, I need to express myself." At this moment, the frame pulls back from the avatar's bust/head to show Being's full-body dancing to the song Got To Be Real. They also periodically say, "Look, booboo, I just can't," and break the tour script to read excerpts from counter-hegemonic theorists like Bell hooks, Paulo Freire, or James Baldwin as a simulation of their agency and or resistance against their indentured servitude.

Since then, Newsome has been in residence at The Stanford Institute for Human-Centered Artificial Intelligence, where he is developing a spin-off called Being 1.5, a mobile/web-based therapy app created to exclusively help African American people manage trauma from daily racial indignities, as well as the second generation of the IRL version called Being 2.0(The Digital Griot). In the artist's words, "Being 2.0 is a reimagining of non-Eurocentric archive and education models like the griot, a West African cultural figure that acts as a historian, library, performance artist, and healer. As a digital griot, Being's purpose is to help humans radically decolonize their minds through workshops that combine lecture, critical thinking, dance, storytelling, EMDR therapy, and mindfulness meditation. Being's approach to education is active and brings new possibilities for research and an enhanced academic experience for all people.

Selected images

Awards 
2021

 Knight Arts + Tech Fellowship, Knight Foundation

2020

 Artist Residency, Stanford Institute for Human-Centered Artificial Intelligence
 Rapid Response Fellowship, Eyebeam

2019

 Art + Technology Lab Grant, LACMA
 MediaMaker Fellowship, BAVC

2018

 William Penn Foundation Grant
 Live Feed Creative Residency, New York Live Arts

2017

 Pollock-Krasner Foundation Grant
 Gold Rush Award, Rush Arts

2016

 Artist Residency at the Tamarind Institute, NM

2014

 Visiting Artist Residency, Headlands Center for the Arts

2011

 Louis Comfort Tiffany Foundation Award

2010

 Urban Artist Initiative Individual Artist Grant

2009

 Rema Hort Mann Foundation Visual Arts Grant

Selected exhibitions

Solo exhibitions 
2022

 Assembly, Park Avenue Armory Drill Hall, New York, NY, United States

2020

 Black Magic, Leslie-Lohman Museum, New York, NY, United States  
 To Be Real, Fort Mason Center for Art & Culture, San Francisco, California, United States

2019

 ICON/STOP PLAYING IN MY FACE!, Museum of the African Diaspora, San Francisco, United States

2017

 Reclaiming Our Time, Debuck Gallery, New York, New York, United States
 Mélange, Contemporary Arts Center, New Orleans, Louisiana, United States

2016

 STOP PLAYING IN MY FACE!, DeBuck Gallery, New York, New York, United States
 THIS IS WHAT I WANT TO SEE, Studio Museum in Harlem, New York, United States

2015

 Order of Chivalry, Savannah College of Art and Design, Georgia, United States
 Silence Please The Show Is About To Begin, Art Gallery of York University, Toronto, Canada

2014

 LS.S, Marlborough Gallery, New York, New York, United States
 FIVE, The Drawing Center, New York, NY, United States

2013

 King of Arms, The New Orleans Museum of Art, New Orleans, Louisiana, United States.

2011

 Herald, Marlborough Chelsea, New York, New York, United States.
 Rashaad Newsome/MATRIX 161, The Wadsworth Atheneum Museum of Art, Hartford, Connecticut, United States.

2010

 Honorable Ordinaries, Ramis Barquet Gallery, New York, New York, United States.
 Futuro, ar/ge Kunst Galerie Museum, Bolzano, Italy.

2009

 Standards, Ramis Barquet Gallery, New York, New York, United States.

Group exhibitions 
2022

 In the Black Fantastic, Hayward Gallery, London, United Kingdom

2021

 The Dirty South: Contemporary Art, Material Culture, and the Sonic Impulse, Virginia Museum of Fine Arts, Richmond, Virginia, United States

2020

 Mothership: Voyage into Afrofuturism, Oakland Museum of California, Oakland, California, United States
 After La vida nueva, Artists Space, New York, New York, United States

2019

 Elements of Vogue, El Museo Universitario del Chopo, Mexico City
 Radical Love, Ford Foundation Gallery, New York, New York, United States

2018

 Something to Say, McNay Art Museum, San Antonio, Texas, United States

2017

 Elements of Vogue, Centro de Arte Dos de Mayo, Madrid, Spain
 Public Movement, Moderna Museet Malmö, Malmö, Sweden

2015

 A Curious Blindness, Columbia University, New York, New York, United States

2014

 Killer Heels, Brooklyn Museum, New York, New York, United States
 BLACK EYE, New York, New York, United States

2013

 GODDESS CLAP BACK: HIP HOP FEMINISM IN ART, CUE Art Foundation, New York, New York, US

2012

 It’s Time to Dance Now, Centre national d'Art et de Culture Georges Pompidou, Paris, France.
 Stage Presence: Theatricality in Art and Media, SFMOMA, San Francisco, California, United States
 The Bearden Project, The Studio Museum in Harlem, New York, New York, United States

2011

 Beauty Contest, Austrian Cultural Forum, New York, New York, United States / MUSA, Vienna, Austria
 Venice Biennale: "Commercial Break", Garage Projects, Venice, Italy

2010

 Free, The New Museum of Contemporary Art, New York, New York, United States
 Greater New York, MoMA PS1, Long Island City, New York, United States
 Whitney Biennial, New York, New York, United States
 Prospect 1.5, Good Children Gallery, New Orleans, Louisiana, United States

Inspiration 
Rashaad Newsome's work blends several practices, including collage, assemblage, sculpture, film, photography, music, computer programming, software engineering, community organizing, and performance, to create a new field that rejects classification. Using the diasporic traditions of improvisation, he pulls from the world of advertising, the internet, Art History, Black and Queer culture to produce counter-hegemonic work that walks the tightrope between creative computing, social practice, abstraction, and intersectionality. The gesture of collage acts as a theoretical, conceptual, and technical method to construct a new cultural framework of power that does not find the oppression of others necessary. Newsome's work celebrates Black contributions to the art canon and creates innovative and inclusive forms of culture and media.

Bibliography 

 Weiyi Chang. (2020). Sofa Jamal, Colleen O’Connor, and Patricio Orellana, After La vida Nueva, exhibition catalogue, Artists Space, NY   
 Jasmine Wahi. (2020). To Be Real, exhibition catalogue, PPAC & Fort Mason Center for Arts & Culture
 Manuel Segade Lodeiro, Sabel Gavaldon. (2019). Elements of Vogue: un caso de estudio de performance radical. Comunidad de Madrid. Publicaciones Oficiales.
 Alok Vaid-Menon. (2017). Reclaiming Our Time, exhibition catalogue, De Buck Gallery
 (2014). KILLER HEELS, exhibition catalogue, Brooklyn Museum
 Doris Zhao, Amanda Hunt. (2016). THIS IS WHAT I WANT TO SEE!, exhibition catalogue, The Studio Museum in Harlem
 Darnell L. Moore, Jasmine Wahi. (2016). STOP PLAYING IN MY FACE!, exhibition catalogue, De Buck Gallery
 Veronica Sekules. (2014). L.egends S.tatements S.tars, exhibition catalogue, Marlborough Gallery
 Kleinberg Romanow, Evan Garza. (2014). FIVE, exhibition catalogue, The Drawing Center,
 Amani Olu. (2011). Herald, exhibition catalogue, Marlborough Gallery
 Luigi Fassi. (2010). GREATER NEW YORK, exhibition catalogue, MOMAPS1
 (2010). Whitney Biennial, exhibition catalogue, Whitney Museum of American Art

References 

Living people
American artists
1979 births